is a hotel located close to Meriken Park, in Kobe, Japan. It was opened in June, 1995, only 6 months after the Great Hanshin earthquake destroyed much of the city. It is in the Kobe waterfront area called Harborland, and is often featured in pictures of Kobe, together with Kobe Port Tower. It was designed by Takenaka Corporation to resemble a luxury liner.

Rooms:  	331
Floors: 	14
Ratings: 	AAA

See also
Port of Kobe

External links

Official Homepage (English version)

Hotels in Kobe
Hotels established in 1995
Hotel buildings completed in 1995